The Arizona Wildcat is a 1939 American comedy Western film directed by Herbert I. Leeds and starring Leo Carrillo and Jane Withers.

Plot
The orphaned Mary Jane Patterson (Jane Withers) is under the guardianship of Manuel Hernandez (Leo Carrillo), once known as the bandit El Gato, who led a gang of outlaws.  Mary Jane wants Hernandez to revive the El Gato gang to rescue the feckless Donald (William "Bill" Henry), the lone survivor of a stage coach robbery engineered by the town's crooked sheriff (Henry Wilcoxon).

It's been a decade since El Gato rode, and Hernandez is now too fat for his bandit costume.  Mary Jane aids the rescue by vandalizing the saddles of the sheriff and his posse. When El Gato does rescue Donald, he is arrested. During the ensuing trial, Mary Jane provides special pyrotechnics, and the courtroom is evacuated.

When Mary Jane finds the stash from the stagecoach robbery hidden in the sheriff's office, Hernandez is appointed as the new sheriff.

Cast
Leo Carrillo – Manuel Hernandez
Jane Withers – Mary Jane Patterson
Pauline Moore - Caroline Reed
William Henry – Donald Clark
Henry Wilcoxon – Sheriff Richard Baldwin
Douglas Fowley — Rufe Galloway
Etienne Girardot — Judge White

References

External links
 
 
 
 

1939 films
American black-and-white films
American Western (genre) comedy films
1930s Western (genre) comedy films
20th Century Fox films
1939 comedy films
Films directed by Herbert I. Leeds
1930s English-language films
1930s American films